The 1987 Texas Longhorns football team represented the University of Texas at Austin in the 1987 NCAA Division I-A football season.  The Longhorns finished the regular season with a 6–5 record and defeated Pittsburgh in the Astro-Bluebonnet Bowl.

Schedule

Roster

Season summary

BYU

vs Oklahoma

NFL Draft
The following players were drafted into professional football following the season.

 Running back Eric Metcalf was drafted by the Cleveland Browns in 1989.

References

Texas
Texas Longhorns football seasons
Bluebonnet Bowl champion seasons
Texas Longhorns football